A standard ruler is an astronomical object for which the actual physical size is known. By measuring its angular size in the sky, one can use simple trigonometry to determine its distance from Earth. In simple terms, this is because objects of a fixed size appear smaller the further away they are.

Measuring distances is of great importance in cosmology, as the relationship between the distance and redshift of an object can be used to measure the expansion rate and geometry of the Universe. Distances can also be measured using standard candles; many different types of standard candles and rulers are needed to construct the cosmic distance ladder.

Relationship between angular size and distance 

The relation between the angular diameter, θ, actual (physical) diameter, r, and distance, D, of an object from the observer is given by:

 
where θ is measured in radians.

Because space is expanding, there is no one, unique way of measuring the distance between source and observer. The distance measured by a standard ruler is what is known as the angular diameter distance. Standard candles measure another type of distance called the luminosity distance.

See also 
Standard candle
Baryon acoustic oscillations
Angular diameter distance
Parallax
Cosmic distance ladder

Astrometry
Length, distance, or range measuring devices